Allocasuarina fibrosa, commonly known as the woolly sheoak, is a shrub of the genus Allocasuarina native to a small area in the central Wheatbelt  region of Western Australia.

It produces red-brown flowers from July to August and cones with long tangled coarse hairs. A. fibrosa is found in sandy and lateritic soils.

The species was first described as Casuarina fibrosa by the botanist Charles Austin Gardner in 1927 in the Journal of the Royal Society of Western Australia. It was subsequently reclassified into the Allocasuarina genera by Lawrence Alexander Sidney Johnson in 1982 in a revision of the sheoaks as part of the work Notes on Casuarinaceae II published in the Journal of the Adelaide Botanic Gardens.

References

fibrosa
Rosids of Western Australia
Fagales of Australia
Plants described in 1982
Dioecious plants